Nicholas of Amiens (Nicholaus Ambianensis) (1147 – c.1200) was a French theologian, a pupil of Gilbert de la Porrée.

He is known for a single major work, the De arte catholicae fidei; it is modelled after Euclid's Elements. Some still attribute it to Alain of Lille, a question that has divided scholars since the nineteenth century.

References
G. R. Evans (1983), Alan of Lille: The Frontiers of Theology in the Later Twelfth Century, Appendix, on the authorship issue
Mechthild Dreyer (1993), Nikolaus von Amiens, Ars fidei catholicae: Ein Beispielwerk axiomatischer Methode

Notes

External links
List of works

1147 births
Year of death unknown
12th-century French Catholic theologians